Myrica rivas-martinezii is a species of plant in the Myricaceae family. It is endemic to three of the Canary Islands (Spain).  It is threatened by habitat loss and fewer than 100 plants are known.

References

rivas-martinezii
Endemic flora of the Canary Islands
Critically endangered plants
Taxonomy articles created by Polbot
Taxobox binomials not recognized by IUCN